Stepanovićevo is a suburban settlement of the city of Novi Sad, Serbia. It has a Serb ethnic majority and a population of 2,021 people (2011 census). Stepanovićevo is situated about 20 km north-west from Novi Sad, between the settlements of Kisač and Zmajevo.

Name
The town was named after Serbian Voivode Stepa Stepanović who distinguished himself in Serbia's wars from 1876 to 1918. In Serbian Cyrillic, the village is known as Степановићево, in Serbian Latin and Croatian as Stepanovićevo.

History
The town was founded after World War I (between 1920 and 1924).

Demographics

Transport
The town is located on the main rail tracks in Serbia, which connect Subotica, Novi Sad, and Belgrade. Stepanovićevo, like most settlements close to Novi Sad, is connected to Novi Sad by the city's bus service JGSP Novi Sad - bus line 43 (the line passes Rumenka and Kisač as well). Many buses on the route Vrbas–Novi Sad also pass through the village.

See also
List of places in Serbia
List of cities, towns and villages in Vojvodina

References

Slobodan Ćurčić, Broj stanovnika Vojvodine, Novi Sad, 1996.

External links

Stepanovićevo 

Suburbs of Novi Sad
Places in Bačka
1920s establishments in Serbia
South Bačka District